Choyon Islam (born 16 November 1961) is a Bangladesh Awami League politician and a former Jatiya Sangsad member representing the Sirajganj-6 constituency.

Career
Choyon Islam was elected to parliament from Sirajganj-6 as a Bangladesh Awami League candidate in 2008. He was made a member of the Parliament standing committee on Jute and Textile Ministry.

References

Living people
1961 births
Awami League politicians
7th Jatiya Sangsad members
9th Jatiya Sangsad members
Place of birth missing (living people)